Saryevo is a rural locality (a selo) and the administrative center of Saryevskoye Rural Settlement, Vyaznikovsky District, Vladimir Oblast, Russia. The population was 409 as of 2010. There are 8 streets.

Geography 
Saryevo is located 29 km west of Vyazniki (the district's administrative centre) by road. Vysokovo is the nearest rural locality.

References 

Rural localities in Vyaznikovsky District
Vyaznikovsky Uyezd